Ola Johansson (born 1960) is a Swedish politician and member of the Riksdag for the Centre Party. He joined the Riksdag after the 2010 general elections, he is currently taking up seat number 39 in the Riksdag for the constituency of Halland County.

He was a candidate to the Riksdag on Halland County's ballot at place number 1 out of 30 on and at place number 1 for the Municipal Council election. During the 2014 general election he campaigned at place number 1 for the Riksdag but switched to place number 4 for the municipal council election. During the 2018 general election he still campaigned at place number 1 on the county's ballot, but he did not appear to run for the municipal council election of that year.
His political interests are priority those regarding policies regarding housing, along with climate change, and the environment.
He is a member of the Committee on Civil Affairs, he also serves as an alternate in the Riksdag for the Committee on the Labour Market and the Committee on Health and Welfare.

Johansson is also the spokesperson for

References 

1964 births
Living people
Members of the Riksdag from the Centre Party (Sweden)
Members of the Riksdag 2010–2014
Members of the Riksdag 2014–2018
Members of the Riksdag 2018–2022
21st-century Swedish politicians